AAL or Aal may refer to:

Finance and business
 Anglo American plc, AAL is the London Stock Exchange stock code for the large mining enterprise
 American Airlines Group, AAL is the NASDAQ stock code for the airline holding company
 Aid Association for Lutherans, one of the companies that formed Thrivent Financial for Lutherans in 2002

Aviation
 Adelaide Airport Limited, owners of the Adelaide Airport
 Australian Air League, Australian Air Cadet Organisation
 AAL, FAA location identifier (LID) for the Alaskan region FAA Distribution Office
 AAL, ICAO airline designator for American Airlines
 AAL, IATA airport code for Aalborg Airport in Aalborg, Denmark
 AAL, Above Aerodrome Level, sometimes referred to as AAE - Above Aerodrome Elevation

Technology, science, law and mathematics
 Abstract algebraic logic, a concept in mathematics
 ATM Adaptation Layers, a technology used in computing information transfer
 Automated Anatomical Labeling, a software package and digital atlas of the human brain
 Australian Academy of Law, a non-government body devoted to the advancement of the discipline of law

Music
 Animals as Leaders, instrumental progressive metal project by guitarist Tosin Abasi
 Arjen Anthony Lucassen, Dutch composer and multi-instrumentalist best known for Ayreon
 Against All Logic, one of several associated acts of the composer and recording artist Nicolas Jaar

Miscellaneous organisations
 Aboriginal Advancement League, an Aboriginal organisation in Melbourne
Aborigines' Advancement League of South Australia, usually AALSA but often referred to as AAL within the state 
 Australian Aborigines' League, a precursor to the Victorian Aborigines Advancement League (now Aboriginal Advancement League, see above)
 American Arena League, a professional indoor football league

Other uses
 Johannes Aal (c. 1500–1553), Swiss Roman Catholic theologian, composer and dramaturg
 Aal (film), a 2014 Tamil film
 Attorney at law
 Anterior Axillary Line, vertical line along the anterior axillary (underarm) fold
 Ambient Assisted Living programme of the European Commission
 Aal (Kocher), a river in Aalen, Baden-Württemberg, Germany, tributary of the Kocher
 Ål, Buskerud, Norway
 Aal, a reddish dyestuff obtained from the roots of the East Indian shrubs (Morinda citrifolia, Morinda tinctoria)
 Afade language (ISO 639-3 code)
 Morinda tinctoria, Indian mulberry also known as aal